The Connecticut Trolley Museum, founded in October 1940, is the oldest incorporated museum dedicated to electric railroading in the United States. The museum is located in East Windsor, Connecticut and is open to the public April through December. The museum features static and moving displays, and self-guided tours of the state's trolley history.

Also located on the same property is the Connecticut Fire Museum which exhibits antique fire apparatus and motor coaches.

Heritage Railroad
The museum operates a 1.5 mile (2.4 km) heritage railroad over the original right-of-way of the Hartford and Springfield Street Railway Company's Rockville Branch. The Rockville Branch started at the Main Fish Market, and ran 17.5 miles (28.2 km) to Rockville, Connecticut. The branch line saw factory workers, tourists, and high school students. The interurban cars were more direct, and could hold more people than the few buses of the time. The line also serviced Piney Ridge, an amusement park located just between Broad Brook and East Windsor. Most trolley companies built parks — like Piney Ridge — to create revenue on the one day no one went to work, Sunday. Piney Ridge featured a large pipe organ, a dance floor on trolley springs, and a baseball field. The dance floor with trolley springs allowed people to ease their knees as they danced the night away. The baseball field hosted games to two major players, Babe Ruth, and Lou Gehrig. Unfortunately when the Hartford and Springfield faced financial debts, the company went out of business. Their streetcars were brought to Piney Ridge and scrapped. By 1926, the track was gone, and the Rockville Branch with it.

It would be 14 years until the Connecticut Electric Railway Association was formed and began restoring service on the line.  Unlimited rides on cars are included in the admission for the day.  A minimum of two different cars are run each day. Many times up to three or four cars will be rotated through during the day, giving visitors an opportunity to experience many different types of streetcars and interurbans.

Collection

The museum has a diverse collection of equipment to help tell the story of the trolley era and its impact on society.  Most of the equipment is stored in one of four car barns, the Visitor Center, or the car shop. Although, there exists an outdoor storage track that is next to the car shop, it goes quite far into the woods.

The Connecticut Trolley Museum has one or more of the following cars operating for the public when the museum is open:

Montreal Tramways sightseeing car 4
 Springfield Terminal combine car 16
 New Orleans Public Service closed car 836
Fair Haven and Westville Railroad open air car 355
 Boston Elevated Railway Type 5 car 5645
Connecticut Company closed car 1326

In addition, the museum is currently working on the following cars in the restoration shop:

 Connecticut Company Birney Safety car (double truck) 3001
 Nassau (New York) Electric Railway car 169
 Oshawa Railway steeplecab 18
Iowa Southern Utilities Co. line car 1
Northern Ohio Traction & Light Co executive car 1500
Boston Elevated Railway PCC 3100
New Jersey Transit PCC 15 (Cosmetic restoration)

The Main Hall of the Visitor Center is set up with an exhibit detailing the progression of the era and its impact on society.  The following cars are on display in the Visitor Center:

 Northern Ohio Traction and Light parlor car 1500
Illinois Terminal PCC 451
 Springfield Electric Railway combine car 10
 Five Mile Beach Electric Railway car 36
 Ponemah Mills Locomotive 1386
 Shaker Heights Rapid Transit car 1201
 Montreal Tramways car 2056
 Fair Haven and Westville car 154
For a full list of the collection, go to their website here.

References

External links

 Connecticut Trolley Museum Website
 Connecticut Fire Museum, with photographs of the collections
CT Trolley Museum "Lusa Car Shop Blog"

Museums established in 1940
Railroad museums in Connecticut
Museums in Hartford County, Connecticut
Heritage railroads in Connecticut
East Windsor, Connecticut
Streetcars in Connecticut
Street railway museums in the United States